Furmanovsky District is an administrative and municipal district (raion), one of the twenty-one in Ivanovo Oblast, Russia. It is located in the north of the oblast. Its administrative center is the town of Furmanov. Population (excluding the administrative center):  6,524 (2002 Census);  Population with the administrative center:  The population of Furmanov accounts for 86.0% of the district's total population.

Administrative and municipal status
The town of Furmanov serves as the administrative center of the district. Prior to the adoption of the Law #145-OZ On the Administrative-Territorial Division of Ivanovo Oblast in December 2010, it was administratively incorporated separately from the district. As a municipal division, Furmanov is incorporated within Furmanovsky Municipal District as Furmanovskoye Urban Settlement.

References

Notes

Sources

Districts of Ivanovo Oblast
